Sali Kelmendi (31 May 1947 – 7 February 2015) was an engineer and a politician. One of the founders of the Democratic Party of Albania in 1990, Sali Kelmendi is the first democratically elected mayor of Tirana in the democratic elections of July 1992.
During the years 1992-1996, over 90% of enterprises and 100% of homes were denationalized. Also a lot of work was done in the housing of the politically persecuted people. Thus, he contributed in the Tirana's transformation from a centrally planned economy to a market oriented system.
Sali Kelmendi suffered a heart attack on 7 February 2015.

References

1947 births
2015 deaths
Democratic Party of Albania politicians
Mayors of Tirana
Politicians from Tirana